Marcel the Shell with Shoes On is a 2010 American trilogy of stop-motion animated mockumentary short films directed by Dean Fleischer Camp, who co-wrote the script with Jenny Slate.

Summary
The films tells the story of Marcel (voiced by Slate), an anthropomorphic seashell outfitted with a single googly eye and a pair of miniature shoes.

Release
The first film premiered theatrically at AFI FEST 2010, where it was awarded Best Animated Short and was an official selection of the 2011 Sundance Film Festival. It won the Grand Jury and Audience Awards at the 2011 New York International Children's Film Festival.

Two additional shorts were released in 2011 and 2014. The first sequel "Marcel the Shell with Shoes On, Two", was posted to YouTube on November 14, 2011. The second sequel, "Marcel the Shell with Shoes On, Three", was posted on October 20, 2014. Each was accompanied by a tie-in storybook featuring Marcel.

Feature-length adaptation

Slate and Fleischer-Camp announced in 2014 that they planned to create a longer film about the character. The feature-length film, Marcel the Shell with Shoes On, premiered at the Telluride Film Festival on September 3, 2021, and stars Jenny Slate, Thomas Mann, Isabella Rossellini, and Rosa Salazar.

References

External links

Marcel the Shell with Shoes On on Vimeo

2010 short films
2010s stop-motion animated films
2010 YouTube videos
2010 animated films
2010 films
2010s animated short films
Film series introduced in 2010
Viral videos
Molluscs in popular culture
Stop-motion animated short films
Seashells in art
2010s English-language films
American mockumentary films
American animated short films
2010s American films
Films directed by Dean Fleischer Camp